Collie Senior High School is a comprehensive public co-educational high day school, located in Collie, a regional centre in the South West region,  south of Perth, Western Australia.

Overview 
The first school in Collie was opened in 1899, when the name of the town was still Coalville. The initial enrolment was for 55 students. The enrolment doubled the next year and a new school house was built. From 1924 the school was known as Collie District High School, and became a Senior High School in 1952.

In 1900 the school had an enrolment of 110 and by 2012 had an enrolment of 486 students between Year 8 and Year 12, approximately 5% of whom were Indigenous Australians.

Dale Miller is the current Principal of Collie Senior High School, after taking up this position in 2017.

Enrolments at the school have been reasonably stable over the last few years with 597 students in 2007, 673 in 2008, 620 in 2009, 549 in 2010, 481 in 2011 and 486 in 2012.

See also

List of schools in rural Western Australia

References

External links
Collie Senior High School website

Public high schools in Western Australia
Educational institutions established in 1899
1899 establishments in Australia
Collie, Western Australia